Ann-Charlotte Acko Linnea Cecilia Ankarberg Johansson (born Ankarberg on 29 October 1964) is a Swedish politician who became a member of the Riksdag in September 2018. She was previously party secretary of the Christian Democrats from December 2010 to September 2018. She is Minister for Health Care in the Ulf Kristersson Cabinet since 18 October 2022.

Ankarberg Johansson served as Mayor of Jönköping from 2006 to 2010. During her leadership, Jönköping Municipality was the largest municipality in Sweden governed by the Christian Democrats.

References 

Living people
1964 births
People from Jönköping
Mayors of places in Sweden
Members of the Riksdag 2018–2022
Members of the Riksdag from the Christian Democrats (Sweden)
Members of the Riksdag 2022–2026
Women members of the Riksdag
21st-century Swedish women politicians
Women government ministers of Sweden
Swedish Ministers for Health